Zion is a city in Lake County, Illinois, United States. Per the 2020 census, the population was 24,655.

History
The city was founded in July 1901 by John Alexander Dowie (1847-1907), a Scots-Australian evangelical minister and faith healer who had migrated to the United States in 1888. By 1890, he had settled in Chicago, where he built a large faith healing business (which included a large mail order component) and had attracted thousands of followers.

He bought land 40 miles north of Chicago to found Zion, where he personally owned all of the land and most businesses. The city was named after Mount Zion in Israel.

Dowie also founded the Zion Tabernacle of the Christian Catholic Apostolic Church, which was the only church in town. The structure was built in the early 1900s and was burned down in 1937, following several decades of tumultuous rule by Dowie's successor, Wilbur Glenn Voliva.

Geography
Zion is located at 

Major streets
  Sheridan Road
  21st Street/Bethlehem Avenue
  Green Bay Road
 Galilee Avenue
 9th Street
 Shiloh Boulevard
 23rd Street
 29th Street
 33rd Street
 Lewis Avenue
 Wadsworth Road

Illinois Beach State Park
Zion is the closest municipality to South Beach within Illinois Beach State Park. The North Beach is in Winthrop Harbor. The beach was originally part of Camp Logan, developed in 1892 as a rifle range by the Illinois National Guard. In World War I and World War II, it served as a rifle range for the Great Lakes Naval Training Station. The range remained in operation until 1973, when it was transferred to the Illinois Department of Conservation.

In 1950, the Illinois Dunes Preservation Society was established to maintain the natural qualities of the beach. With the help of the Illinois Department of Conservation, the area south of Beach Road was established as the state's first natural preserve. The sections of the northern beach, between Beach Road and the Wisconsin state border, were acquired by the state between 1971 and 1982.

The Illinois Beach Resort and Conference Center is located at the south beach. The North Point Marina, one of the largest in the Great Lakes region, is at the north beach. It is Illinois' newest and largest marina.

On May 9, 2000, the area encompassing Illinois Beach State Park and North Point Marina was officially designated as the Cullerton Complex in honor of William J. Cullerton, Sr., a war hero, avid environmentalist, and long-time friend of conservation.

Demographics

2020 Census

Note: the US Census treats Hispanic/Latino as an ethnic category. This table excludes Latinos from the racial categories and assigns them to a separate category. Hispanics/Latinos can be of any race.

2010 Census
At the 2010 census, there were 24,508 people, 7,552 households and 5,558 families residing in the city. The racial make-up was 48.9% White, 31.10% African American, 0.4% Native American, 2.3% Asian, 0.1% Pacific Islander, 12% from other races and 5% from two or more races. Hispanic or Latino of any race were 27.7% of the population.

There were 7,552 households, of which 44.1% had children under the age of 18 living with them, 48.9% were married couples living together, 20.0% had a female householder with no husband present and 26.4% were non-families. 21.6% of all households were made up of individuals, and 6.3% had someone living alone who was 65 years of age or older. The average household size was 2.96 and the average family size was 3.44.

33.2% of the population were under the age of 18, 9.5% from 18 to 24, 31.4% from 25 to 44, 17.4% from 45 to 64 and 8.4% were 65 years of age or older. The median age was 30 years. For every 100 females, there were 94.3 males. For every 100 females age 18 and over, there were 88.0 males.

The median household income was $45,723 and the median family income was $50,378. Males had a median income of $37,455 and females $27,563. The per capita income was $17,730. About 10.1% of families and 11.9% of the population were below the poverty line, including 15.5% of those under age 18 and 7.7% of those age 65 or over.

Transportation

The city is served by Metra's Union Pacific/North Line through Zion railway station on the east side. It connects the city to Chicago, Kenosha and intermediate communities. Pace bus line 571 provides internal transit service in Zion and connects the city to Waukegan.

Sports
The 8,500-seat Fielders Stadium was planned to open in May 2010. Once completed, it was to host the home games of the Lake County Fielders North American League baseball team co-owned by the actor Kevin Costner. The Fielders' name is an homage to Costner's 1989 film Field of Dreams, with the logo showing a ballplayer standing in a field of corn.

The Fielders' site has been subject to a court dispute between the owners and the city over a breach in contract.

Notable people 

 Jarvis Brown, member of 1991 World Series champion Minnesota Twins
 Richard Bull, actor, "Nels Olson" on Little House on the Prairie
 Gary Coleman, actor, "Arnold Jackson" on Diff'rent Strokes
 Joe Daniels, drummer for Local H
 John Alexander Dowie, founder of Zion
 Paul Erickson, baseball player, mostly with Chicago Cubs
 John Hammond, general manager of the Orlando Magic and former general manager of the Milwaukee Bucks
 James Gordon Lindsay, pastor and founder of Christ for the Nations Institute
 Scott Lucas, lead singer and guitarist for Local H
 Billy McKinney, former NBA player, former NBA general manager, former commentator and current head scout for the Milwaukee Bucks
 Juan Moreno, two-time Olympic silver medalist (1992 and 1988) in Taekwondo in the Fin-weight (under 50 kg) class and three-time Olympian (2000, 1992, 1988); assistant coach with the U.S. Olympic Team at the 2008 Olympics
 Russell Nype, star of Broadway's Call Me Madam and Hello, Dolly! and Tony Award winner
 Shoes, power pop band including Gary Klebe, Jeff Murphy, John Murphy
Lenzelle Smith Jr. (born 1991), basketball player in the Israel Basketball Premier League

Controversy 

Until the 1940s, Zion enshrined the Flat Earth doctrine in its religious code.

The former city seal was the subject of a 1990 Federal Court case, because it featured a crown and scepter, a dove, a cross and the words "God Reigns". The founder of Zion and designer of the city seal, John Alexander Dowie, intended for these to be Christian symbols and added them "for the purpose of the extension of the Kingdom of God upon earth ... where God shall rule in every department of family, industry, commercial, educational, ecclesiastical and political life". The court ruled the city could not use these religious symbols in its seals and emblems. While the Christian symbolism was removed, the phrase "In God We Trust" could be used on the new city seal since it was already acceptable religious language in the public arena.

See also 
 Zion Nuclear Power Station

References

Bibliography

External links 

 City of Zion
 Zion Area Chamber of Commerce
 Zion Park District
 

1901 establishments in Illinois
Chicago metropolitan area
Cities in Lake County, Illinois
Cities in Illinois
Populated places established in 1901
Zion, Illinois
Majority-minority cities and towns in Lake County, Illinois